Phyllophora is a genus of large bush crickets typical of the subfamily Phyllophorinae.  Species have been recorded from: Sri Lanka, peninsular Malaysia, Malesia and Australia.

Species
The Orthoptera Species File lists:
 Phyllophora acuminata Karny, 1924
 Phyllophora aequifolia Karny, 1924
 Phyllophora angustata Brunner von Wattenwyl, 1898
 Phyllophora bidentata Karny, 1924
 Phyllophora bispinosa Karny, 1924
 Phyllophora boschmai de Jong, 1964
 Phyllophora brunnea Kirby, 1899
 Phyllophora cheesmanae de Jong, 1972
 Phyllophora dubia Karny, 1924
 Phyllophora eburneiguttata Kirby, 1899
 Phyllophora erosifolia Karny, 1924
 Phyllophora filicerca Karny, 1924
 Phyllophora guttata Karny, 1924
 Phyllophora heurnii Karny, 1924
 Phyllophora horvathi Blatchley, 1903
 Phyllophora inusta de Jong, 1946
 Phyllophora karnyi Kästner, 1933
 Phyllophora keyica Brunner von Wattenwyl, 1898
 Phyllophora laminata Karny, 1924
 Phyllophora longicerca Karny, 1924
 Phyllophora media Walker, 1870
 Phyllophora ovalifolia Kirby, 1899
 Phyllophora papuana Kästner, 1933
 Phyllophora parvidens Karny, 1924
 Phyllophora pellucida Karny, 1924
 Phyllophora picta Karny, 1924
 Phyllophora retroflexa Karny, 1924
 Phyllophora similis de Jong, 1972
 Phyllophora speciosa Thunberg, 1815 - type species

References

External links
 

Orthoptera of Asia
Ensifera genera
Tettigoniidae